County Wexford is a county in Ireland. It is in the province of Leinster and is part of the Southern Region. Named after the town of Wexford, it was based on the historic Gaelic territory of Hy Kinsella (Uí Ceinnsealaigh), whose capital was Ferns. Wexford County Council is the local authority for the county. The population of the county was 149,722 at the 2016 census.

History

The county is rich in evidence of early human habitation. Portal tombs (sometimes called dolmens) exist at Ballybrittas (on Bree Hill) and at Newbawn — and date from the Neolithic period or earlier. Remains from the Bronze Age period are far more widespread. Early Irish tribes formed the Kingdom of Uí Cheinnsealaig, an area that was slightly larger than the current County Wexford.

County Wexford was one of the earliest areas of Ireland to be Christianised, in the early 5th century. Later, from 819 onwards, the Vikings invaded and plundered many Christian sites in the county. Vikings settled at Wexford town near the end of the 9th century.

In 1169, Wexford was the site of the invasion of Ireland by Normans at the behest of Diarmuid Mac Murrough, King of Uí Cheinnsealaig and king of Leinster (Laigin). This was followed by the subsequent colonisation of the country by the Cambro-Normans.

The native Irish began to regain some of their former territories in the 14th century, especially in the north of the county, principally under Art MacMurrough Kavanagh. Under Henry VIII, the great religious houses were dissolved, 1536–41; in County Wexford this included Glascarrig Priory, Clonmines Priory, Tintern Abbey, and Dunbrody Abbey.

On 23 October 1641, a major rebellion broke out in Ireland, and County Wexford produced strong support for Confederate Ireland. Oliver Cromwell and his English Parliamentarian Army arrived in 1649 in the county and captured it. The lands of the Irish and Anglo-Normans were confiscated and given to Cromwell's soldiers as payment for their service in the Parliamentarian Army. At Duncannon, in the south-west of the county, James II, after his defeat at the Battle of the Boyne, embarked for Kinsale and then to exile in France.

County Wexford was the most important area in which the Irish Rebellion of 1798 was fought, during which significant battles occurred at The Battle of Oulart Hill during the 1798 rebellion. Vinegar Hill (Enniscorthy) and New Ross. The famous ballad "Boolavogue" was written in remembrance of the Wexford Rising. At Easter 1916, a small rebellion occurred at Enniscorthy town, on cue with that in Dublin. During World War II, German planes bombed Campile. In 1963 John F. Kennedy, then President of the United States, visited the county and his ancestral home at Dunganstown, near New Ross.

Geography and subdivisions

Wexford is the 13th-largest of Ireland's thirty-two traditional counties in area, and 14th-largest in terms of population. It is the largest of Leinster's 12 counties in size, and fourth-largest in terms of population. The county is located in the south-east corner of the island of Ireland. It is bounded by the sea on two sides—on the south by the Atlantic Ocean and on the east by St. George's Channel and the Irish Sea. The River Barrow forms its western boundary. The Blackstairs Mountains form part of the boundary to the north, as do the southern edges of the Wicklow Mountains. The adjoining counties are Waterford to the south-west, Kilkenny to the west, Carlow to the north-west and Wicklow in the north.

Towns and villages

County Town: Wexford
Market Town: Gorey

 Adamstown
 Arthurstown
 Ballycanew
 Ballycullane
 Ballyedmond
 Ballyfad
 Ballygarrett
 Ballyhack
 Ballymitty
 Ballywilliam
 Bannow
 Barntown
 Blackwater
 Bree
 Bridgetown
 Broadway
 Bunclody
 Camolin
 Campile
 Castlebridge
 Castletown
 Cleariestown
 Clohamon
 Clonroche
 Coolgreany
 Courtown
 Craanford
 Crossabeg
 Cullenstown
 Curracloe
 Duncannon
 Duncormick
 Enniscorthy
 Ferns
 Fethard-on-Sea
 Foulkesmill
 Gorey
 Hollyfort
 Inch
 Killinierin
 Kilmore
 Kilmore Quay
 Kilmuckridge
 Kiltealy
 Monamolin
 Monaseed
 Murrintown
 Monageer
 Monbeg
 Newbawn
 New Ross
 Oulart
 Oylegate
 Poulpeasty
 Rathangan
 Rosslare
 Rosslare Harbour
 Raheen
 Rathnure
 Saltmills
 Taghmon
 Watch House Village
 Wellingtonbridge
 Wexford

Mountains and hills

Largely low-lying fertile land is the characteristic landscape of the county.

Other high points:
 Black Rock Mountain, located near the Wexford-Carlow border, within County Wexford.
 Croghan Mountain (or Croghan Kinsella) on the Wexford-Wicklow border - 
Annagh Hill, near the Wicklow border
 Slieveboy, 

Notable hills include: Carrigbyrne Hill; Camross (or Camaross) Hill, ; Carrigmaistia, ; Bree Hill, ; Gibbet Hill; Vinegar Hill; Slievecoiltia; Forth Mountain, ; and Tara Hill.

Rivers and lakes
The major rivers are the Slaney and the Barrow. At  in length, the river Barrow is the second-longest river on the island of Ireland. Smaller rivers of note are the Owenduff, Pollmounty, Corrock, Urrin, Boro, Owenavorragh (also spelt Ounavarra), Sow and Bann rivers.

There are no significant fresh-water lakes in the county. Small seaside lakes or lagoons exist at two locations – one is called Lady's Island Lake and the other Tacumshin Lake.

The Wexford Cot is a flat-bottomed boat used for fishing on the tidal mudflats in Wexford. A canoe-shaped punt fitted with a gun, called a float in Wexford, is used traditionally to shoot game birds in the North Slob mud flats.

Islands

Climate

County Wexford, sometimes dubbed Ireland's "sunny southeast", has in general a higher number of hours of sunshine recorded daily than in the rest of the country.
This has resulted in Wexford becoming one of the most popular places in Ireland in which to reside. The county has a mild, but changeable, oceanic climate with few extremes. The North Atlantic Drift, a continuation of the Gulf Stream, moderates winter temperatures. There is a meteorological station located at Rosslare Harbour. The prevailing winds blow from the south-west. Precipitation falls throughout the year. Generally, the county receives less snow than more northerly parts of Ireland. Heavy snowfalls are relatively rare, but can occur. The one exception is Mount Leinster, visible from a large portion of the county, and frequently covered with snow during the winter months. Frost is frequent in winter months, less so in coastal areas.

Soil
An ice sheet covered most, but not all, of the county during the last Ice age. As the ice retreated, County Wexford would have been one of the first areas to be covered with glacial drift (a mixture of boulders, clay, sand and gravel) that blanketed the existing bedrock. This has led to high-quality soils, suitable for a wide range of agriculture. A very detailed soil survey of the county was published in 1964 as part of the 'National Soil Survey of Ireland'. It classifies each area of the county according to its specific soil type.

Most of the county is covered with soils called brown earths, described as well-drained and having a wide use-range. After that, gleys (poorly to imperfectly drained with a limited use-range) are the next major soil type, primarily located in the south-east of the county and east of Gorey (along the coast). Gleys are dotted elsewhere around the county in small areas, and where they occur they generally form bogland. The last major soil type, brown podzolics, occur mainly near the edges of the Blackstairs Mountain range and around Bunclody and in the baronies of East Shelmalier and South Ballaghkeen. Though there are areas covered with other soil types, these are of limited extent.

Flora
Common species of tree include oak, ash, sycamore, alder, blackthorn, hawthorn, beech and birch. Less common (but plentiful) species include wild cherry and Scots pine (also called red deal). Elm is now far less common, due to the devastating effects of Dutch elm disease. Gorse (or furze) is very common. A priority habitat in Wexford is the grey dune, on which many native wild flora grow, including bee orchid and pyramidal orchid. Despite the designation of much of this habitat as a Special Area of Conservation, it remains threatened by destruction for agricultural intensification. There is very little natural forest in the county. Most natural trees and vegetation grow on hedgerows.

Fauna

South-eastern Wexford is an important site for wild birds—the north side of Wexford Harbour, the North Slob, is home to 10,000 Greenland white-fronted geese each winter (roughly one third of the entire world's population), while in the summer Lady's Island Lake is an important breeding site for terns, especially the roseate tern. The grey heron is also seen.

Throughout the county pheasant, woodpigeon and feral pigeons are widespread. Mute swan, mallard, kingfisher, and owls (the long-eared owl, the short-eared owl, and the barn owl) are less common - but plentiful. Red grouse, once common, is now extremely scarce. The species has been in decline for some decades. Threats include habitat degradation, disease, predation and over-hunting. Red grouse in Ireland are now considered threatened. The corncrake, also once very common, is now almost never seen. Smaller birds—such as crows, swallows, robins, wrens and so on—are very common. The first magpies in Ireland were recorded by Robert Leigh, of Rosegarland, County Wexford, as having appeared in the County of Wexford about 1676.
Land mammals include badger, rabbit, otter, hedgehog, red fox, mink, bats, squirrels (red and grey), rats (brown and black - both introduced species), and mice (wood (or field) and house). Two types of hare—the Irish (or mountain) hare and the less common brown (or European) hare—are found. Hare is not nearly as common as rabbit. The stoat (Mustela erminea hibernica) is also reasonably common. Locally the stoat is just as often incorrectly called a weasel.

Only two types of seal are found on County Wexford's coast—Atlantic grey seals are very plentiful in coastal areas; the slightly smaller common (or harbour) seal is less common, yet plentiful. The small tortoiseshell butterfly (reddish-orange colour, with black markings) is the most common species of butterfly in the county. Various types of moth are also common. The common frog - the only type of frog found - is plentiful.

Governance and politics

Local government
Wexford County Council has thirty-four members. The council has three representatives on the Southern Regional Assembly, where it is part of the South-East strategic planning area.

National politics
County Wexford is represented by the Dáil constituency of Wexford (5 seats).

The county is part of the European Parliament constituency of South (5 seats).

Demographics
In 2016, the county had a total population of 149,722 people. Of these, 61.4% (91,969 people) lived in rural areas and 38.6% (57,753 people) lived in urban areas. 83.8% of the population stated their religion as Roman Catholic, 7.1% other religions, and 7.5% stated they had no religion. Between 2006 and 2011, the population increased by 10%, slowing to 3% between 2011 and 2016.

Urban areas and populations

Culture

Since 1951, an opera festival, Wexford Festival Opera, takes place every year in the Theatre Royal in Wexford town and runs for several weeks. In 2008, a new Opera House replaced the old one on the same site, once called the Wexford Opera House, but in 2014 being designated as Ireland's National Opera House. It consists of two theatres, the O'Reilly Theatre and the Jerome Hynes Theatre.

There is a renowned singing tradition in County Wexford. Having an abundance of traditional songs, many of which relate to the rebellion of 1798, the county has for many years had a strong presence in the Irish traditional singing scene. Noted singers include All-Ireland Fleadh Champions Paddy Berry, Seamus Brogan and Niall Wall. Paddy Berry has also collected and published a number of songs from Wexford.

Beaches in Curracloe, County Wexford were used to film the opening scenes of the movie Saving Private Ryan, which depicted the D-day assault on Omaha Beach. The Count of Monte Cristo, directed by Kevin Reynolds, was partly filmed in the village of Duncannon in 2000 — Duncannon Fort being used for one of the main scenes. The movie Brooklyn (film) was partially set and filmed in Enniscorthy and featured some of the locals as extras.

Media
Two radio stations are based in the county: South East Radio and Beat 102-103.

The county's main newspapers include Wexford People, New Ross Standard, Gorey Guardian, and Enniscorthy Echo.

Places of interest
The scenic Bannow Drive, popular amongst tourists, is a signposted route through four Wexford villages: Duncormick, Cullenstown, Bannow and Wellingtonbridge.

Ballyteigue Burrow, located near Duncormick, is one of the finest protected sand dune systems in Ireland. Rich in wildflowers, wildlife and butterflies, this 9 km (6 mile) coastal stretch is a protected nature reserve by the golden sands of Ballyteigue Bay, with spectacular scenery.

The Hook Peninsula is noted for its many beaches and spectacular scenery. It features the medieval Hook Head lighthouse and the historic townland of Loftus Hall.

Popular beaches are located at Courtown, Curracloe, Carnsore Point, Duncannon and Rosslare Strand.

Other places of interest include:

Ferns Castle and Abbey
Enniscorthy Castle and Museum
Vinegar Hill
National 1798 Visitor Centre
Boolavogue
The Browne-Clayton Monument
Oulart Hill
Castleboro House
The Seven 'Castles' of Clonmines
Johnstown Castle
Dollar Bay
Loftus Hall - Abandoned Haunted House (the first Hall was built on this site in 1350) www.loftushall.ie
Ballyteigue Castle
Bannow Church (dates from the 13th century)
Selskar Abbey, Wexford town
Irish National Heritage Park (Ferrycarrig)
Tacumshin windmill (southeast County Wexford)
St. Mary's Church, New Ross
Dunbrody Abbey
Tintern Abbey
Slade Castle
Ballyhack Castle
J.F. Kennedy homestead and park
Slieve Coilte
Wells House and Gardens
Duncannon Fort
Saltee Islands

Economy

Agriculture

The economy is chiefly agricultural. Cattle, sheep, pig rearing and some horse breeding are the main types of husbandry practised. Poultry rearing, once popular, has very much declined. Wheat, barley, rapeseed, and oats are grown, as are potatoes. Sugar beet is no longer grown due to the withdrawal of EU subsidies. The numbers involved in farming have been declining for many years and many of the seasonal workers are now eastern Europeans. Mushrooms are also grown indoors. Tomatoes are grown under glass, for example at Campile.

Wexford strawberries are famous and can be bought in shops and wayside stalls throughout the summer. Every year, near the end of June, a 'Strawberry Fair' Festival takes place in the town of Enniscorthy, and a Strawberry Queen is crowned. Dairy farming forms an important part of the agricultural industry. Locally produced milk is on sale in many supermarkets. Wexford Irish Cheddar is a brand, and Carrigbyrne, a full-flavoured soft cheese, is produced near New Ross.

Forestry
Evergreen tree species are extensively cultivated, especially in more recent years—Norway spruce and Sitka spruce are the most common varieties planted. These are generally sown on poorer quality soils (mainly in bogs and on hills or mountainsides). A small amount of deciduous trees are also planted, though these require better soils.

Mining
Silver was once mined at Clonmines—primarily in Tudor times. Lead was mined at Caim, 1818 - c. 1850—this mine also contains zinc; the two are usually found together. Copper ore (malachite) is found at Kerloge, just south of the town of Wexford. Iron is found in small quantities at Courtown Harbour. The county is not noted for mineral reserves. No significant mining activity is currently practised, with the exception of quarrying for stone.

Energy

Carnsore Point made the national headlines in the late 1970s after a proposal was made to build a nuclear energy plant there; the plans were abandoned after extensive protests from the public, due to environmental and health concerns. 
Great Island Power Station opened in 1967 and was operated by the Electricity Supply Board (ESB) until it was sold to Endesa in January 2009. It is an electricity-generating station fueled by heavy fuel oil and rated at 240 MW. It is located at the confluence of the rivers Barrow and Suir, near Campile. Before its sale, the station was scheduled to close by 2010. Endesa propose building a 430 MW combined cycle gas turbine (CCGT) gas fired plant on the site. A wind farm has now been built on the site, featuring 14 wind turbines generating electricity. It was completed in November 2002 and was the first wind farm on the east coast of Ireland. Wind farms now exist at a few other locations in the county, such as Ballywater Wind Farm, at Cahore (near Kilmuckridge), on the county's east coast, and Richfield wind farm, located in the southeast of the county.

Transport
 Bus: Wexford and Dublin are linked by Bus Éireann route 2, while route 5 operates Waterford-New Ross-Enniscorthy-Dublin. There are numerous local bus routes radiating from Wexford town to places such as Kilmore Quay, Lady's Island, Kilmuckridge.
 Rail: The Rosslare–Dublin railway line runs through the county, serving Rosslare Europort, Rosslare Strand, Wexford, Enniscorthy and Gorey. Four trains run in each direction daily (three at weekends), with additional commuter services from Gorey. The Rosslare–Limerick railway line which traverses the southern part of the county is now mothballed but being maintained (it served stations at Bridgetown, Wellington Bridge, Ballycullane and Campile).
 Ferry: Rosslare Europort, located at Rosslare Harbour, operates a busy ferry service. There are regular sailings to Wales (Pembroke and Fishguard) and France (Cherbourg and in the summer months to Roscoff) for passengers and vehicles. There is also ferry service in operation between Ballyhack and Passage East (County Waterford), crossing the Barrow estuary.

Sport and events

Gaelic games

In recent years the county Football team has been making rapid advances. Camogie, a women's version of hurling, is also played, and Wexford won the All Ireland in 2007, 2010, 2011 and 2012. Wexford Park is the county's main GAA pitch, holding 25,000 supporters. Also, handball is played on a limited basis; there are a number of handball alleys located throughout the county.

As a county, Wexford are most noted for hurling have won the Leinster Senior Hurling Championships a total of 21 times, first in 1890 and most recently in 2019.

In the All Ireland Senior Hurling Championships, Wexford have won 6 times, first in 1910 and most recently in 1996, beating Limerick in the final.

Football
Wexford Youths F.C., formed 2007, renamed as Wexford FC in 2017, is the major football club in the county, currently playing in the League of Ireland First Division.

Golf

There are numerous golf clubs in the county - including Rosslare (a Links course), and Enniscorthy. Two more are located near Gorey - Ballymoney Golf Club and Courtown Golf Club -  are 18 hole golf courses. Bunclody Golf and Fishing Club, boasting Europe's only golf lift, is situated just inside County Carlow. There are also a few others. New Ross Golf Club, however, is actually located in County Kilkenny - about 1 km (1,000 yards) from New Ross town.

There are also a number of other Par-3 courses in the county.

Fishing
Maritime activity takes at various locations in County Wexford, including at Kilmore Quay and Slade Harbour. Common fish species include herring, mackerel, cod, monkfish, whiting, bass, perch, gurnard, haddock, mullet, pollock, John Dory, sole, conger eel, shad, salmon, trout, pike, carp, and tench. Shellfish include mussels, cockles, periwinkles, clams, and oysters.

Racing
Wexford Racecourse (horse racing) is located at Wexford town
and there is a Greyhound Racing track at Enniscorthy.

People

Bunny Ahearne - president of the International Ice Hockey Federation
Michael Balfe - 19th-century composer, grew up in Wexford
John Banville - novelist (2005 Booker Prize and 2013 Austrian State Prize for European Literature)
Major G. E. H. Barrett-Hamilton - zoologist, grew up in Kilmanock
John Barry - Commander United States Navy
Paddy Berry - singer, song collector and folklorist
Wallis Bird - musician
Des Bishop - New York-born comedian, went to school in County Wexford
Jim Bolger ONZ - former Prime Minister of New Zealand.
Jim Bolger (racehorse trainer) - horse trainer.
Myles Byrne - participant in the Irish Rebellion of 1798
Thomas Cloney - participant in the Irish Rebellion of 1798
John Henry Colclough – participant in the Irish Rebellion of 1798
Eoin Colfer - best-selling writer of children's literature
Brendan Corish - Irish Labour Party leader and Tánaiste
Richard Corish - Trade Unionist
Gordon D'Arcy- Rugby player, Leinster & Ireland
Tadhg Furlong- Rugby player, Leinster & Ireland
Francis Danby - 19th-century painter
Chris de Burgh - Argentinian-born singer-songwriter, based in County Wexford
Pádraic Delaney - actor
John Doran (British Army officer)
Anne Doyle - RTÉ newsreader
Kevin Doyle - football player
Mary Fitzgerald (trade unionist)
Nicholas French - former RC Bishop of Ferns
Nicholas Furlong - writer, journalist and historian
Eileen Gray - 20th-century Irish furniture designer and architect and a pioneer of the Modern Movement in architecture, raised in Enniscorthy
Anna Maria Hall (Mrs. S.C. Hall) - 19th-century novelist, raised in Bannow
John Harrison - recipient of the Victoria Cross
Beauchamp Bagenal Harvey - participant in the Irish Rebellion of 1798
Edward Hay - writer of a history of the Irish Rebellion of 1798
Herbert Hore - historian
William Kehoe - iron founder
Patrick Kennedy - great-grandfather of John F. Kennedy (former president of the United States).
Father John Murphy - participant in the Irish Rebellion of 1798.
Col Joshua Nunn - veterinarian and barrister
Aidan O'Brien - horse trainer
Joseph O'Brien (jockey) - son of Aidan O'Brien and horse trainer, formerly jockey
Thomas O'Connor (rancher) - Irish rancher and landowner
Michael O'Hanrahan - Irish rebel executed for fighting in the 1916 Easter Rising.
Chris O'Neill - animator/musician and online entertainer
Nicky Rackard - hurling player
John Redmond - 19th- 20th-century nationalist politician
Billy Roche - playwright
Dick Roche - politician
Patrick Roche - politician
James Ryan - politician and Irish Revolutionary
Martin Storey - hurling player
Colm Tóibín - novelist (2006 International Dublin Literary Award)
Maverick Sabre - singer/songwriter

See also

List of towns and villages in Ireland
List of abbeys and priories in Ireland (County Wexford)
Lord Lieutenant of Wexford
High Sheriff of Wexford

References

Bibliography
Byrne, Francis J. Irish Kings and High Kings. Dublin, 1973–2001
Carlyle, Thomas. "Oliver Cromwell's Letters and Speeches". Vol. 1. New York: Wiley & Putnam, 1845
Cambrensis, Giraldus. Expugnatio Hibernica - The Conquest of Ireland. Dublin: R.I.A., 1978
Colfer, Billy. The County of Wexford. County Wexford: Foillsitheoirí Cois Sláine, n.d. - 1980 or 1981.
Furlong, Nicholas. A History of County Wexford. Dublin: Gill & MacMillan, 2003. 
Furlong, Nicholas and John Hayes. County Wexford in the Rare Oul' Times Vol. IV. 1910–1924. Wexford: Old Distillery Press, 2005. 
Ordnance Survey Ireland (OSi). Discovery Series 77 - Co Wexford (part). Scale 1: 50,000. Dublin: OSI, Phoenix Park, 1997. 
The Times Atlas of the World – Reference Edition. London: Times Books, 1995–2002. 
Whelan, K.(ed) & W. Nolan (assoc. ed.). Wexford: History and Society. Dublin: Geography Publications, 1987

External links

 County Council website
 Late 19th-century map of County Wexford
 History Articles

 

 
Wexford
Wexford
Wexford